Karelskaya Mushnya is a rural locality (a village) in Yaganovskoye Rural Settlement, Cherepovetsky District, Vologda Oblast, Russia. The population was 28 as of 2002.

Geography 
Bolshoye Krasnovo is the nearest rural locality.

References 

Rural localities in Cherepovetsky District